Steinersville is an unincorporated community in Belmont County, in the U.S. state of Ohio.

History
Steinersville was laid out in 1831 by John W. Steiner, and named for him.

References

Unincorporated communities in Belmont County, Ohio
1831 establishments in Ohio
Populated places established in 1831
Unincorporated communities in Ohio